The North Wales Cricket League is the top level of competition for recreational club cricket in North Wales, and the league Headquarters is based in Rhosfadog, Trefriw, Conwy. Since 2001, the North Wales Cricket League has been an accredited ECB Premier League as part of the expansion of cricket at a grassroots level.

Champions

Championships won

Performance by season from 2001

References

External links
 Official play-cricket website
 Cricket Wales

Welsh domestic cricket competitions
ECB Premier Leagues